Daniel Marius Morar (born August 15, 1966) is a Romanian jurist, who was Chief Prosecutor of the Romanian National Anticorruption Directorate (DNA), the agency responsible for investigating, preventing and prosecuting corruption-related offenses. The National Anticorruption Directorate under Morar's leadership is credited as one of the pivotal actors in Romania's anti-corruption fight. Since 2013 he has been a supreme judge on Romania's Constitutional Court.

Biography 

Since September 2001, he has indicted nine deputies, three Secretaries of State and former Prime Minister Adrian Năstase.

As Chief of the National Anticorruption Directorate, he started re-opening files that had been previously closed by the former DNA management. The Năstase case was one of those. Morar's policy is to work on all the "shadow zones" that led the European Commission to label the fight against the corruption as one of the conditions Romania had to fulfill in order to accede to the European Union. While important steps have been made in this direction, the clearance of the old corruption and bribery involved personnel is compulsory.

External links
  Daniel Morar's profile on the National Anticorruption Directorate website

1966 births
Living people
Romanian prosecutors
Anti-corruption activists